Talavera de la Reina pottery is a traditional type of faience, or tin-glazed earthenware made in Talavera de la Reina, Toledo (Spain). The area has a long history of pottery, and dishes, jars, ceramics and other objects have been found in recent archaeological excavations. Some of the materials discovered date back to the Roman Empire.

Arabs brought to the city new techniques, including a new kind of kiln for firing pottery. During that era, many of the pieces included abstract motifs as prescribed by Muslim religious restrictions. In the fifteenth century, Jan Floris brought new styles from Holland. He founded a factory which started the pottery tradition of the city.

Ceramics of Talavera have been used to make fountains; examples exist in Cuba and Brazil. Tiles for buildings have been made; some are in New Orleans, Tokyo and Paris. Its presence in royal palaces and museums all over the world testify to its quality.

There are different styles of Talavera de la Reina Pottery:

 Baroque
 Renaissance
 Bird collections
 House collections
 Religious collections
 Hunting scenes

Workshops in the town keep up the tradition pottery, including Ruiz de Luna and Emilio Niveiro.

Colonial Mexican Talavera pottery comes from and is named after the Talavera de la Reina pottery.

Notable historical azulejos
Ducal Palace of Vila Viçosa: azulejos
Guadalajara, Castilla-La Mancha: Former sights

Gallery

References

Spanish pottery
Azulejos in Spain
Talavera de la Reina
History of ceramics